The Florida Army National Guard is Florida's component of the United States Army and the United States National Guard.  In the United States, the Army National Guard comprises approximately one half of the federal army's available combat forces and approximately one third of its support organization.  Federal coordination of various state National Guard units are maintained through the National Guard Bureau.  The Florida Army National Guard was composed of approximately 10,000 soldiers (as of March 2009). The main state training grounds is Camp Blanding.

Florida Army National Guard units are trained and equipped as part of the United States Army.  The same enlisted ranks and officer ranks and insignia used by the United States Army are used by Army National Guardsmen and the latter are eligible to receive all United States military awards. The Florida National Guard also bestows a number of state awards for local services rendered in or to the state of Florida.

History

The predecessor of the Florida Army National Guard was a Spanish Florida militia formed in 1565 in the newly established presidio town of St. Augustine.  On September 20, 1565, Spanish admiral and Florida's first governor, Pedro Menéndez de Avilés, attacked and defended Florida from an attempted French settlement at Fort Caroline, in what is now Jacksonville. The subsequent Florida militia served with the Spanish crown for 236 years, Great Britain for a 20 years, and the Confederate States of America for 5 years.

In 1702–1704, an inter-Indian Native American conflict started as part of Queen Anne's War involving the English armies on one side and the Spanish on another resulted in the Apalachee massacre. The conflict later also escalated into the Yamasee War. After the end of the First Seminole War in 1821, the Florida provinces joined the United States, a process finalized in the ratification of the Adams–Onís Treaty.  From 1835 to 1842 the Second Seminole War resulted in the elimination by force of most of the Native Americans from the territory.  Florida was incorporated into the United States as a state in 1845. After Florida's incorporation into the United States problems with Seminoles continued until almost 1860.

Some of the immediate origins of the Florida ARNG today can be traced to the Florida State Troops. Today's 124th Infantry Regiment was reorganized and established in the Florida State Troops as five battalions between 1888 and 1892.

The Militia Act of 1903 organized the various state militias into the present National Guard system. The Florida ARNG included elements of the 51st Infantry Division from 11 September 1946 to 1963 and was originally headquartered at the Fort Homer Hesterly Armory in Tampa, Florida. The Florida ARNG also included the 48th Armored Division from 1954 to 1968.

In 1986, the 1st Battalion, 111th Aviation Regiment, was organized from pre-existing Florida ARNG aviation units at Craig Airport in Jacksonville and Lakeland Linder Regional Airport in Lakeland, the Lakeland unit relocating to Brooksville–Tampa Bay Regional Airport in Brooksville in 1999 and the Craig Airport unit relocating to Cecil Airport, the former NAS Cecil Field, in 2000.

The Florida Army National Guard was composed of approximately 9,950 soldiers in January 2001, subsequently increasing to its current size

Historic units
  124th Infantry Regiment
  153rd Cavalry Regiment
  116th Field Artillery Regiment
  111th Aviation Regiment
  265th Air Defense Artillery Regiment
 187th Armored Regiment

Units
 53rd Infantry Brigade Combat Team
 Headquarters and Headquarters Company
 1st Battalion 167th Infantry Regiment
 1st Battalion 124th Infantry Regiment
 2nd Battalion 124th Infantry Regiment
 1st Squadron 153rd Cavalry Regiment
  753rd Brigade Engineer Battalion
 83rd Troop Command
 3rd Battalion, 20th Special Forces Group
  1st Battalion, 111th Aviation Regiment
  2nd Battalion, 111th Aviation Regiment (Airfield Operations Battalion) Returned home from an deployment in Iraq and Kuwait on May 8, 2010.
  2nd Battalion, 151st Aviation Regiment (Support & Security/ Reconnaissance and Interdiction Detachment)
 146th Expeditionary Signal Battalion
 870th Engineer Company
 868th Engineer Company
50th Regional Support Group
  927th Combat Service Support Battalion
Headquarters and Headquarters Company
631st Maintenance Company
256th Medical Company
144th Transportation Company
 Detachment 1, 32nd Army Air & Missile Defense Command
 211th Infantry Regiment (Regional Training Institute) 
 260th Military Intelligence Battalion (Linguist)
A Military Intelligence Company 
B Military Intelligence Company
C Military Intelligence Company 
356th Quartermaster Company 
856th Quartermaster Company
13th Army Band
 164th Air Defense Artillery Brigade
 1st Battalion, 265th Air Defense Artillery Regiment (Avenger)
 3rd Battalion, 265th Air Defense Artillery Regiment (Avenger)
 3rd Battalion, 116th Field Artillery Regiment
 254th Transportation Battalion
Headquarters and Headquarters Detachment
715th Military Police Company 
806th Military Police Company 
690th Military Police Company
1218th Transportation Company (Cargo)

Duties

National Guard units can be mobilized at any time by presidential order to supplement regular armed forces, and upon declaration of a state of emergency by the governor of the state in which they serve. Unlike Army Reserve members, National Guard members cannot be mobilized individually (except through voluntary transfers and Temporary Duty Assignments, e.g. TDY), but only as part of their respective units.

Active Duty Callups
Army National Guard personnel who are "Traditional Guardsmen" (TG) typically serve "One weekend a month, two weeks a year", with a smaller portion of personnel working for the Guard in a full-time capacity as either Active Guard Reserve (AGR) or Army Reserve Technicians (ART).  TG personnel in more intensive combat specialties, such as on active flying status in Army Aviation or in unique ground units such as Special Forces, will often perform additional military duty beyond the standard 48 weekend drills and 17 days on active duty annual training, with such periods of duty often totaling in excess of 100 days per year.

Current Department of Defense policy is that no Guardsman will be involuntarily activated for a total of more than 24 months (cumulative) in one six-year enlistment period (this policy has changed 1 August 2007, the new policy states that soldiers will be given 24 months between deployments of no more than 24 months, individual states have differing policies).  The largest mobilization in state history began in mid-2009.  More than 4,000 FLARNG soldiers were called to active duty and most were to be deployed to Iraq and Afghanistan.

See also

Florida Naval Militia
Florida State Guard
MCTFT

References

External links

 Bibliography of Florida Army National Guard History compiled by the United States Army Center of Military History
 Florida National Guard, accessed 20 Nov 2006
 GlobalSecurity.org Florida Army National Guard

United States Army National Guard by state
Military in Florida